Przysietnica may refer to the following places in Poland:

Przysietnica, Subcarpathian Voivodeship (south-west Poland)
Przysietnica, Lesser Poland Voivodeship (south Poland)